Ward v. Rock Against Racism, 491 U.S. 781 (1989), was a United States Supreme Court case.

In an opinion by Justice Kennedy, the Court rejected a First Amendment challenge to a New York City regulation that mandated the use of city-provided sound systems and technicians to control the volume of concerts in New York City's Central Park. The Court found that the city had a substantial interest in limiting excessive noise and the regulation was "content neutral." The court found that "narrow tailoring" would be satisfied if the regulation promoted a substantial government interest that would be achieved less effectively without the regulation.

Justices Marshall, Brennan, and Stevens dissented.

In his dissent, Marshall agreed with the majority that the government has a substantial interest in controlling noise but believed that it may not advance that interest by actually asserting control over the amplification equipment and thus over private expression itself. The government has an obligation to adopt the least intrusive restriction necessary to achieve its goals such as enforcing the noise ordinance that has already been adopted.

External links 
 

United States Supreme Court cases
United States Supreme Court cases of the Rehnquist Court
United States Free Speech Clause case law
1989 in United States case law